KMID may refer to:

 KMID (TV), a television station in Midland, Texas
 KMid, a discontinued KDE MIDI player